Tetraviridae was a family of viruses named due to its members having T=4 symmetry and infecting butterflies and moths. The family was dissolved in 2011 due to genetic differences and replaced with three families, each of which still contain the name tetraviridae:

Alphatetraviridae
Carmotetraviridae
Permutotetraviridae

References

Obsolete virus taxa
Unaccepted virus taxa